Nymphargus oreonympha (common name: Caqueta Cochran frog) is a species of frog in the family Centrolenidae, formerly placed in Cochranella. It is endemic to Colombia where it occurs on the Cordillera Oriental in Florencia, the Caquetá Department.
Its natural habitat is cloud forest, including secondary forest, where it occurs on vegetation near streams. Its conservation status is unclear.

The dorsum has numerous small tubercles.

References

oreonympha
Amphibians of the Andes
Amphibians of Colombia
Endemic fauna of Colombia
Amphibians described in 1991
Taxa named by John Douglas Lynch
Taxonomy articles created by Polbot